The Fisherman from Heiligensee is a 1955 West German romantic comedy film directed by Hans H. König and starring Edith Mill, Lil Dagover and Albert Lieven. It was part of the post-war boom in heimatfilm in Germany.

The film's sets were designed by the art director Max Seefelder. The film was shot on location in Austria and Bavaria and at the Bavaria Studios in Munich. It was made using Agfacolor.

Cast
 Edith Mill as Baronesse Sabine von Velden
 Lil Dagover as Baronin Hermine von Velden
 Albert Lieven as Wolfgang von Döring
 Helmuth Schneider as Stefan Staudacher
 Anneliese Kaplan as Bärbel Altenburg
 Heinrich Gretler as Fischer-Bartl
 Beppo Brem as Beppo, Kutscher
 Siegfried Lowitz as Gilchert
 Anni Golz as Magd
 Ernst Firnholzer as Prokurist der Baufirma
 Ingeborg Christiansen as Dienstmädchen auf Gut Velden
 Michael Rabanus as Graphologe
 Liselotte Berker as Sekretärin der Baufirma
 Gardy Artinger as Kellnerin
 Petra Unkel
 Franz Fröhlich
 Alex Weber
 Uli Steigberg
 Georg Bauer

References

Bibliography 
 Von Moltke, Johannes. No Place Like Home: Locations Of Heimat In German Cinema. University of California Press, 2005.

External links 
 

1955 films
West German films
German romantic comedy films
1955 romantic comedy films
1950s German-language films
Films directed by Hans H. König
Films shot at Bavaria Studios
1950s German films